Nothing New Since Rock 'n' Roll is the first full-length album by UK pop punk band The Fight. It was released in 2004.

Track listing
"Can't be bothered" (Turley, Turley) - 2:46
"Karaoke star" (Nott/Turley, Turley) - 3:09
"Moved on" (Turley, Turley) - 2:59
"Sid and Nancy" (Turley, Turley) - 1:52
"Forgotten Generation" (Mich Walker) - 2:25
"JB's" (Turley, Turley) - 3:13
"No more legend" (Turley, Turley) - 4:07
"Mommy's little soldier" (Turley, Turley) - 2:22
"Housewreck" (Turley, Turley) - 2:59
"Stage skool kidz" (Turley, Turley) - 2:57
"Don't tell me" (Nott/Turley, Turley) - 2:46
"Revolution calling" (Turley, Turley) - 3:14
"Shut up yourself" (Turley, Turley) - 3:06
"Johnny can't hackett" (Turley, Turley) - 3:293

Personnel
Kate Turley - vocals, guitar
Jack Turley - drums
Tom Calder - bass
Scott Milner - guitar

The Fight (band) albums
2004 albums
Albums produced by Neal Avron